The Left Liberals were a political party in Luxembourg.

History
The party was formed as a result of a split in the Liberal League by the 'old Liberals' including Robert Brasseur and Norbert Le Gallais; the other faction formed the Radical Socialist Party. In the 1925 elections it received 2.8% of the vote, winning a single seat.

The party did not contest any further elections, but retained its seat in the partial elections of 1928 as it was not up for election.

References

Liberal parties in Luxembourg
Defunct political parties in Luxembourg
Defunct liberal political parties
Political parties disestablished in 1934
1934 disestablishments in Luxembourg
Radical parties